The 2014 Glastonbury Festival of Contemporary Performing Arts was held between 25 and 29 June 2014.

Ticket sales
Initially a small selection of tickets were sold for people who wished to travel by coach. A few days later the standard tickets were released where ticket sales sold out in record time of one hour and 27 minutes. Sofirula were the first shop that sold all the official merchandising.

Line-up
On 19 December 2013, it was announced that Arcade Fire would headline the Pyramid Stage on Friday 27 June 2014. Kasabian will headline on Sunday 29 June.
In early March 2014, Glastonbury announced that Dolly Parton would perform at the festival via their Facebook page, although didn't confirm if she would be headlining. 
Other acts that self-confirmed were Disclosure (who will play the Other Stage on the Friday), Blondie, Lily Allen and Foxes. The artist headlining on Saturday was listed as special guests due to legal reasons. Metallica were later announced as the special guests.

As of 30 April 2014, the following artists have been announced to perform:
 Arcade Fire (headline act)
 Metallica (headline act)
 Kasabian (headline act)
 Dolly Parton
 Lana Del Rey
 Jack White
 St. Vincent
 Elbow
 The Black Keys
 Robert Plant and the Sensational Space Shifters
 Lily Allen
 Skrillex
 Pixies
 Massive Attack
 Disclosure
 Paolo Nutini
 Manic Street Preachers
 M.I.A.
 Rudimental
 Bryan Ferry
 Richie Hawtin
 Ed Sheeran
 De La Soul
 Goldfrapp
 Caro Emerald
 London Grammar
 MGMT
 Jake Bugg
 Jurassic 5
 Dexys
 Above & Beyond
 The 1975
 Bonobo
 Kelis
 Blondie
 Warpaint
 The Wailers
 Wilko Johnson
 James Blake
 Gorgon City
 Metronomy
 Tinariwen
 Chvrches
 Little Dragon
 Seun Kuti & Egypt 80
 Kodaline
 Interpol
 Foster the People
 Mogwai
 Royal Blood
 John Grant
 Annie Mac Lil Louis
 Daptone Super Soul Revue
 John Newman
 Chromeo
 Rodrigo y Gabriela
 Midlake
 Angel Haze
 Four Tet
 ESG
 Sun Ra Arkestra
 François Kevorkian
 Parquet Courts
 Danny Brown
 Crystal Fighters
 Nitin Sawhney
 DJ Pierre
 Toumani & Sidiki Diabaté
 Chance The Rapper
 MNEK
 Temples
 Phosphorescent
 Connan Mockasin
 Public Service Broadcasting
 Courtney Barnett
 Wolf Alice
 Radiophonic Workshop
 Suzanne Vega
 Tune-Yards
 Jagwar Ma
 Eats Everything
 Jamie xx
 Ms. Dynamite
 Breach
 Chlöe Howl
 Troker
Aquilo

References

External links

2014 in British music
2014 in England
2010s in Somerset
2014
June 2014 events in the United Kingdom